The 1937 Tennessee Volunteers (variously Tennessee, UT, or the Vols) represented the University of Tennessee in the 1937 college football season. Playing as a member of the Southeastern Conference (SEC), the team was led by head coach Robert Neyland, in his 11th year, and played their home games at Shields–Watkins Field in Knoxville, Tennessee. They finished the season with a record of six wins, three losses and one tie (6–3–1 overall, 4–3 in the SEC). The team had the most ever punts per game of 13.9

Schedule

References

Tennessee
Tennessee Volunteers football seasons
Tennessee Volunteers football